Eric Thomas Paslay (born January 29, 1983) is an American country music singer and songwriter. He has released one album for EMI Nashville, which contains the hit singles "Friday Night", "Song About a Girl", and "She Don't Love You". In addition to these, Paslay has written several hit singles for other artists, and has collaborated with Amy Grant, Dierks Bentley, Charles Kelley, among others.

Early life
Eric Thomas Paslay was born in Abilene, Texas, and started playing guitar at the age of 15. He graduated from Middle Tennessee State University in the fall of 2005 with his Bachelor of Science degree.

Career 
In mid-2011, Paslay signed to EMI Records Nashville. After his first two singles "Never Really Wanted" and "If the Fish Don't Bite" failed to make top 40, his third, "Friday Night", was a Top 5 hit on Country Airplay in early 2014. The song was originally recorded by Lady Antebellum, and Paslay's version appears on his self-titled debut album, released in early 2014. The album went on to produce two more singles in "Song About a Girl" and "She Don't Love You".

He also co-wrote Jake Owen's "Barefoot Blue Jean Night", the Will Hoge/Eli Young Band song "Even If It Breaks Your Heart", and Love and Theft's "Angel Eyes" all of which were number 1 singles on the country charts. He has written album cuts for Lady Antebellum, Rascal Flatts' 2014 single "Rewind" and Keith Urban's 2021 single "Wild Hearts".

In 2013, Paslay appeared on Amy Grant's album How Mercy Looks from Here, sharing lead vocals with Grant and Sheryl Crow on a song he wrote called "Deep As It Is Wide". In publicity for the album, Grant stated that she is most excited about Paslay as an up-and-coming artist.

Paslay is featured alongside Dierks Bentley on Charles Kelley's debut solo single "The Driver" which was released on September 28, 2015. "The Driver" received a Grammy nomination for Best Country Duo/Group Performance for the 58th Annual Grammy Awards. This is Paslay's first Grammy nomination as a recording artist.

In October 2015, Paslay released "High Class" as the lead single to his upcoming second studio album.  The album's second single, "Angels in This Town", released to country radio on July 18, 2016.

Paslay released a five-song digital extended play, The Work Tapes, in July 2017. Paslay parted ways with EMI Records Nashville in September 2018.

Personal life
On April 26, 2015, Paslay married Natalie Harker. On December 8, 2018 they had their first daughter, Piper Lily Paslay.

Paslay has type 1 diabetes.

Discography

Studio albums

Extended plays

Singles

As a featured artist

Music videos

Awards and nominations

References

External links

1983 births
American country singer-songwriters
American male singer-songwriters
Living people
Singer-songwriters from Texas
EMI Records artists
People from Abilene, Texas
People from Waco, Texas
People from Temple, Texas
People from Murfreesboro, Tennessee
People from Nashville, Tennessee
Singer-songwriters from Tennessee
21st-century American singers
Country musicians from Texas
Country musicians from Tennessee
21st-century American male singers
People with type 1 diabetes